24-26 Lower Fort Street, Millers Point are heritage-listed terrace houses located at 24, 26 Lower Fort Street, in the inner city Sydney suburb of Millers Point in the City of Sydney local government area of New South Wales, Australia. The property was added to the New South Wales State Heritage Register on 2 April 1999.

History 
Millers Point is one of the earliest areas of European settlement in Australia, and a focus for maritime activities. This property was constructed , forming part of a row of substantial Georgian townhouses. First tenanted by the NSW Department of Housing in 1991.

Description 
Two storey late Georgian townhouse with attic roof behind parapetted facade, two storey timber verandah with cast iron balustrading. Townhouse converted to four one-bedroom units. Storeys: Two; Construction: Painted rendered masonry, corrugated galvanised iron roof, iron lace, painted timber joinery. Style: Victorian Georgian.

The external condition of the property is fair.

Modifications and dates 
External: Dormer modified, timberwork attached.

Heritage listing 
As at 23 November 2000, this townhouse was constructed , and is part of a substantial row of Georgian townhouses.

It is part of the Millers Point Conservation Area, an intact residential and maritime precinct. It contains residential buildings and civic spaces dating from the 1830s and is an important example of 19th century adaptation of the landscape.

24-26 Lower Fort Street, Millers Point was listed on the New South Wales State Heritage Register on 2 April 1999.

See also 

Australian residential architectural styles

References

Bibliography

Attribution

External links

 
 

New South Wales State Heritage Register sites located in Millers Point
Georgian Revival architecture in Australia
Terraced houses in Sydney
Articles incorporating text from the New South Wales State Heritage Register
Houses completed in the 19th century
1860s establishments in Australia
Millers Point Conservation Area